Jason mirabilis is a species of sea slug, or more precisely an aeolid nudibranch, a marine gastropod mollusc in the family Facelinidae.

References 

 Sea Slug Forum info
  Spencer H.G., Willan R.C., Marshall B.A. & Murray T.J. (2011) Checklist of the Recent Mollusca Recorded from the New Zealand Exclusive Economic Zone.

Further reading 

 Powell A. W. B., New Zealand Mollusca, William Collins Publishers Ltd, Auckland, New Zealand 1979 

Facelinidae
Gastropods of New Zealand
Gastropods described in 1974